Goyder may refer to one of several people or places.

People
Alice Kirkby Goyder (1875–1964), English artist
George Goyder (1826–1898), Surveyor General of South Australia
Joe Goyder (1907–1986), English boxer
Mark Goyder (born 1953), English author and CEO
Richard Goyder (born 1960), Australian businessman

Places
All places called Goyder are named, directly or indirectly, after George Goyder.

Australia

Northern Territory
Electoral division of Goyder 
Goyder River
Goyder crater 
Hundred of Goyder (Northern Territory), a cadastral division

South Australia
Goyder, South Australia, a locality
Regional Council of Goyder
Hundred of Goyder (South Australia) a cadastral division
Electoral district of Goyder 
Goyder's Line, a boundary delineating a climate zone
Goyder Highway
Goyder Lagoon